This is a list of notable former and current faculty and staff members of Oregon State University (OSU), a four-year research and degree-granting public university in Corvallis, Oregon in the United States. The university traces its roots back to 1856 when Corvallis Academy was founded. It was not formally incorporated until 1858 when the name was changed to Corvallis College, and wasn't chartered until 1868, when the name was changed to Corvallis College and Agricultural College of Oregon. The university changed names several more times, adopting its current name in 1961. Faculty and staff from each of these eras may be included on the list, and more than 2,900 people are currently employed there.

Academics

Faculty

Presidents

Athletics

Baseball

Basketball

 Stephen Thompson Jr. (born 1997), basketball player in the Israeli Basketball Premier League

Football

Head coaches

Assistant coaches

Wrestling

Multi-sport

Other

See also
List of Oregon State University alumni
List of people from Oregon

Notes
i. ^  The university also changed its name to Corvallis State Agricultural College in 1872, Corvallis College and State Agricultural College in 1879, Corvallis Agricultural College in 1881, Corvallis College and Oregon State Agricultural College in 1882, Oregon State Agricultural College in 1883, Corvallis College and Oregon Agricultural College in 1885, State Agricultural College of Oregon in 1886, State Agricultural College of the State of Oregon in 1888, Oregon Agricultural College in 1890, Agricultural College of the State of Oregon in 1896, Oregon Agricultural College (again) in 1908, and Oregon State College in 1937.

References

Oregon State faculty

Faculty